Usha Thorat, (born 20 February 1950) served as Deputy  Governor of the Reserve Bank of India (RBI) (India's central bank) from 10 November 2005 to 8 November 2010. Prior to this she was the executive Director of the RBI.

Early life
Thorat is an alumna of the Lady Shri Ram College for Women, New Delhi and Delhi School of Economics.

Career
Usha Thorat has been the Reserve Bank of India nominee on the boards of Bank of Baroda, Indian Overseas Bank and the Securities Trading Corporation of India.

She has been Executive Director of RBI since April 2004. As Deputy Governor she was responsible for the Department of Currency Management, Deposit Insurance and Credit Guarantee Corporation, Inspection Department, Premises Department, Rural Planning and Credit Department and Urban Banks Department.

She has been one of the key players in the Indian Central Banks efforts toward promoting Financial Inclusion.

References

External links

Reserve Bank of India

20th-century Indian economists
Indian women bankers
Indian bankers
Central bankers
Delhi University alumni
1950 births
Living people
Delhi School of Economics alumni
Lady Shri Ram College alumni
Indian women economists
20th-century Indian women scientists
20th-century Indian scientists
21st-century Indian women scientists
21st-century Indian economists
Scientists from Chennai
Women scientists from Tamil Nadu
Businesspeople from Chennai
Businesswomen from Tamil Nadu
20th-century Indian businesswomen
20th-century Indian businesspeople
21st-century Indian businesswomen
21st-century Indian businesspeople